The national symbols Saudi Arabia are official and unofficial flags, icons or cultural expressions that are emblematic, representative or otherwise characteristic of Saudi Arabia and of its culture.

Symbol

References 

National symbols of Saudi Arabia